Quincy Township, Michigan may refer to:

 Quincy Township, Branch County, Michigan
 Quincy Township, Houghton County, Michigan

Michigan township disambiguation pages